The South Island is the southern of the two main islands of New Zealand.

South Island may also refer to:

 South Island (McDonald Islands)
 South Island (South Australia), in Pondalowie Bay
 South Island, County Down, a townland in County Down, Northern Ireland
 Yuzhny Island, the southern of the two large islands of Novaya Zemlya
 South Island, Cocos (Keeling) Islands
 Suðuroy (South Island in Faroese), the southernmost of the Faroe Islands
 South Island (Kenya),  an island on Lake Turkana, Kenya

See also
Austronesia
South Island line
South Island line (West)
South Island School
North Island (disambiguation)